The Tata Steel Chess Tournament 2019 was the 81st edition of the Tata Steel Chess Tournament. It was held in Wijk aan Zee, Alkmaar and Leiden from 11–27 January 2019. The tournament was won by Magnus Carlsen.

{| class="wikitable" style="text-align: center;"
|+81st Tata Steel Masters, 12–27 January 2019, Wijk aan Zee — Alkmaar — Leiden, Netherlands, Category XXI (2753)
! !! Player !! Rating !! 1 !! 2 !! 3 !! 4 !! 5 !! 6 !! 7 !! 8 !! 9 !! 10 !! 11 !! 12 !! 13 !! 14 !! Total !! SB !! TPR
|-
|-style="background:#ccffcc;"
| 1 || align="left" | || 2835 || || ½ || ½ || ½ || 1 || ½ || ½ || ½ || 1 || 1 || ½ || 1 || 1 || ½ ||9|| || 2888
|-
| 2 || align="left" | || 2783 || ½ ||  || 0 || ½ || ½ || ½ || ½ || 1 || 1 || 1 || 1 || ½ || ½ || 1 ||8½|| || 2861
|-
| 3 || align="left" | || 2763 || ½ || 1 ||  || ½ || ½ || 1 || ½ || 0 || ½ || ½ || 1 || ½ || 0 || 1 ||7½|| 48.75 || 2809
|-
| 4 || align="left" | || 2813 || ½ || ½ || ½ ||  || ½ || ½ || ½ || 1 || ½ || ½ || ½ || ½ || 1 || ½ ||7½|| 47.25 || 2805
|-
| 5 || align="left" | || 2773 || 0 || ½ || ½ || ½ ||  || ½ || ½ || ½ || ½ || ½ || ½ || 1 || 1 || 1 ||7½|| 44.25 || 2809
|-
| 6 || align="left" | || 2695 || ½ || ½ || 0 || ½ || ½ ||  || 0 || ½ || ½ || ½ || ½ || 1 || 1 || 1 ||7|| || 2787
|-
| 7 || align="left" | || 2757 || ½ || ½ || ½ || ½ || ½ || 1 ||  || ½ || ½ || ½ || 0 || ½ || ½ || ½ ||6½|| 43.25 || 2753
|-
| 8 || align="left" | || 2725 || ½ || 0 || 1 || 0 || ½ || ½ || ½ ||  || ½ || ½ || 0 || ½ || 1 || 1 ||6½|| 40.00 || 2755
|-
| 9 || align="left" | || 2725 || 0 || 0 || ½ || ½ || ½ || ½ || ½ || ½ ||  || 1 || ½ || ½ || 1 || ½ ||6½|| 38.50 || 2755
|-
| 10 || align="left" | || 2738 || 0 || 0 || ½ || ½ || ½ || ½ || ½ || ½ || 0 ||  || 1 || ½ || 0 || 1 ||5½|| || 2697
|-
| 11 || align="left" | || 2724 || ½ || 0 || 0 || ½ || ½ || ½ || 1 || 1 || ½ || 0 ||  || ½ || 0 || 0 ||5|| 34.25 || 2668
|-
| 12 || align="left" | || 2817 || 0 || ½ || ½ || ½ || 0 || 0 || ½ || ½ || ½ || ½ || ½ ||  || ½ || ½ ||5|| 31.25 || 2661
|-
| 13 || align="left" | || 2612 || 0 || ½ || 1 || 0 || 0 || 0 || ½ || 0 || 0 || 1 || 1 || ½||  || 0 ||4½|| 28.00 || 2654
|-
| 14 || align="left" | || 2777 || ½ || 0 || 0 || ½ || 0 || 0 || ½ || 0 || ½ || 0 || 1 || ½ || 1 ||  ||4½|| 26.75 || 2641
|}

{| class="wikitable" style="text-align: center;"
|+2019 Tata Steel Challengers, 12–27 January 2019, Wijk aan Zee, Netherlands, Category XIV (2580)
! !! Player !! Rating !! 1 !! 2 !! 3 !! 4 !! 5 !! 6 !! 7 !! 8 !! 9 !! 10 !! 11 !! 12 !! 13 !! 14 !! Total !! SB  !! TPR
|-
| 1 || align="left" | || 2687 ||  || ½ || 1 || ½ || ½ || ½ || ½ || 1 || 1 || 1 || ½ || 1 || 1 || 1 || 10 ||  || 2783
|-
| 2 || align="left" | || 2584 || ½ ||  || ½ || ½ || 1 || ½ || 0 || ½ || 1 || 1 || 1 || 1 || ½ || ½ || 8½ || 51.50 || 2690
|-
| 3 || align="left" | || 2615 || 0 || ½ ||  || 1 || ½ || 1 || ½ || ½ || ½ || 1 || 1 || ½ || 1 || ½ || 8½ || 51.25 || 2687
|-
| 4 || align="left" | || 2604 || ½ || ½ || 0 ||  || ½ || ½ || ½ || 1 || ½ || ½ || 1 || 1 || 1 || 1 || 8½ || 48.00 || 2688
|-
| 5 || align="left" | || 2699 || ½ || 0 || ½ || ½ ||  || ½ || ½ || 1 || ½ || 1 || ½ || ½ || ½ || 1 || 7½ || 45.25  || 2628
|-
| 6 || align="left" | || 2643 || ½ || ½ || 0 || ½ || ½ ||  || 1 || ½ || ½ || ½ || ½ || ½ || 1 || 1 || 7½ || 44.25 || 2632
|-
| 7 || align="left" | || 2650 || ½ || 1 || ½ || ½ || ½ || 0 ||  || 0 || 0 || ½ || 1 || 1 || ½ || 1 || 7 || 41.75 || 2604 
|-
| 8 || align="left" | || 2679 || 0 || ½ || ½ || 0 || 0 || ½ || 1 ||  || ½ || ½ || ½ || 1 || 1 || 1 || 7 || 37.50 || 2601
|-
| 9 || align="left" | || 2502 || 0 || 0 || ½ || ½ || ½ || ½ || 1 || ½ ||  || ½ || ½ || ½ || 1 || 0 || 6 || || 2557
|-
| 10 || align="left" | || 2500 || 0 || 0 || 0 || ½ || 0 || ½ || ½ || ½ || ½ ||  || ½ || 1 || ½ || 1 || 5½ || || 2529 
|-
| 11 || align="left" | || 2539 || ½ || 0 || 0 || 0 || ½ || ½ || 0 || ½ || ½ || ½ ||  || ½ || ½ || 1 || 5 || || 2496
|- 
| 12 || align="left" | || 2472 || 0 || 0 || ½ || 0 || ½ || ½ || 0 || 0 || ½ || 0 || ½ ||  || ½ || ½ ||3½ || 20.50 || 2413
|-
| 13 || align="left" | || 2477 || 0 || ½ || 0 || 0 || ½ || 0 || ½ || 0 || 0 || ½ || ½ || ½ ||  || ½ || 3½ || 20.00 || 2413
|-
| 14 || align="left" | || 2470 || 0 || ½ || ½ || 0 || 0 || 0 || 0 || 0 || 1 || 0 || 0 || ½ || ½ ||  || 3 || || 2378
|}

External links

Website Tata Steel 2019

References

Tata Steel Chess Tournament
2019 in chess
2019 in Dutch sport